The Mark of Cain (also seen as the initialism, TMOC) are an alternative metal band from Adelaide, South Australia. Their style has been likened to that of Helmet and Rollins Band, yet this band pre-dates both groups and was influenced by the early work of Joy Division, Big Black and United States hardcore groups. The Mark of Cain were formed in mid-1984 by brothers, John (guitar) and Kim Scott (bass guitar), with Rod Archer on vocals and Gavin Atkinson playing drums. Before long, Archer had left the group and John Scott took on the lead vocal role and the group has remained a trio ever since. The Scotts have been the core of the band which has featured 15 different drummers. Since January 2001, former Helmet member John Stanier has been their drummer; he is also concurrently with Tomahawk and Battles. Australian musicologist, Ian McFarlane, described the group's sound as "Gloomy, monotonous vocals and bleak slabs of metallic guitar did battle over a lurching rhythm section to arrive at a harsh sound." Rod Archer died on 26 February 2016. 2019 marks the 30th Anniversary of the release of the Battlesick album. A major national tour is planned to celebrate the occasion. Eli Green again tours with the band fulfilling the drumming duties.

History

1984–1989: Formation and Battlesick 
The Mark of Cain were formed as a punk rock group in Adelaide in mid-1984 by Rod Archer on lead vocals; Gavin Atchison on drums (ex-Spiral Collapse); John Scott on lead guitar (ex-Spiral Collapse) and his younger brother Kim Scott on bass guitar. Their name references the Hermann Hesse's novel, Demian (1919), which in turn recalls the Genesis story regarding the mark of Cain. John had read Demian, which featured " a loner who thought his dark feelings were there for anyone to see as he walked down the street – the Mark of Cain." Atchison and John's earlier group, Spiral Collapse, broke up as John was concentrating on his university course, he also wanted a "new, harder sound" and disliked that band's lead singer. John assisted Kim to develop his bass guitar skill and met Archer at one of Spiral Collapse's last gigs.

Ian McFarlane, an Australian musicologist, described "the band's penchant for militaristic imagery and lyric themes (to say nothing of the members' close-cropped, marine-styled looks) only added to the sense of desperation and solitude displayed in the band's music." By the end of 1985 Archer had left and John Scott added lead vocals to his guitar work. They replaced Archison with a succession of drummers: David Graham, Roger Crisp, John Rickert, Neil Guive and then Campbell Robinson by late 1988. During 1987 they supported an Adelaide gig by United States group, Big Black, during their Australian tour.

The band's first release was a single, "The Lords of Summer", issued on Sydney label, Phantom Records, in September 1988. It was co-produced by the group with Anthony Bannister and was recorded at Adelaide's Soundtrack Australia studios in January of that year. They covered two tracks by former Phantom groups, "Journey by Sledge" (the Visitors) and "Seein' Double" (Shy Impostors) for a gig give-away album, Assorted Desecrations and Magnificent Mutations, in October, by various artists, to celebrate the label's tenth anniversary. Phantom's owners "had heard something different in the group than what they wanted to deliver, and their progress was periodically interrupted as they kept changing drummers."

The band signed with local label, Dominator Records, which issued their debut album, Battlesick in August 1989. It was co-produced by Stuart Sheldon and the group, which was recorded at Artec Studios, Adelaide in February and March of that year. Patrick Emery of i-94 Bar felt Battlesick was "dominated by the band's Joy Division streak. On 'You Are Alone' John Scott intones in his best Ian Curtis manner while Kim Scott's bass pounds with the relentless precision of artillery session captured on loop." Ox Fanzines Joachim Hiller opined that it "combined gloomy early eighties sounds with brachial, bass-heavy Noiserock."

1990–1995: The Unclaimed Prize and Ill at Ease
Their second album, The Unclaimed Prize, was released in March 1991. It was recorded at Artec Sound Vision Productions during January to May 1990. Emery described how it "opens with the pummelling beat of "Fire in Her Heart", complete with John Scott's semi-demented ranting. It's a style the band built on – and arguably perfected – on its Ill at Ease album released in 1995 ... The lyrics suggest a love song of sorts, yet this is no sappy Crosby, Stills, Nash and Young 'Judy Blue Eyes' folkie-lust. It's as if the warmth and tenderness of the opposite sex merely serves to break down the narrator’s sense of self and internal emotional structure."

Emery opined that the group's "style has been interpreted as misogynist, arrogant, aloof and even just too bloody loud, but its potency has never been questioned, nor the Scott brothers' commitment to duty. If ever there was a musical metaphor for human endurance, its TMOC. This music doesn't date, especially not in the current security-constructed climate." McFarlane felt the album "offered up more sonic blasts of rough-hewn guitar riffs and booming drums." In 1995 the Dominator label issued both albums, Battlesick and The Unclaimed Prize, as a 2× CD set. The Scott brothers, each took sabbaticals from the band during 1990 (John) and 1991 (Kim) to undertake a "work-related project", including travelling to Chicago. In mid-1992 the group reconvened.

Steve Albini (of Big Black) produced their next release, a six-track extended play, Incoming, released in June 1993. Albini had met the Scott brothers back in 1987 when Mark of Cain had supported his group's tour. The EP was the recording debut for Robinson's replacement, Aaron Hewson (ex-Order of Decay, Grunter), who had joined on drums, after the release of their second album, The Unclaimed Prize. The tracks were recorded at Artec Studios and Soundtrack, Adelaide and Chicago Recording Studios, from 1988 to 1991. Early in 1994 the group performed on the Big Day Out tour and followed, in February, with a non-album single, "Tell Me", on the Insipid Vinyl label. McFarlane felt "the band's influences had broadened to include Sonic Youth, Godflesh and Helmet." Dominator released their next EP, The Killer Within, in July 1995. The group had supported a run of international visiting groups, Rollins Band, Fugazi, Helmet, Albini's Shellac, Butthole Surfers, Killdozer, All, Pavement and Primus.

Albini's involvement with the Mark of Cain led to Henry Rollins (of Rollins Band) financing and producing the band's breakthrough album, Ill at Ease (November 1995). It was recorded at Nesci Studios, Adelaide, in July–August of that year. Ill at Ease became the band's first released to chart inside the ARIA top 100, peaking at number 73. It gained wide radio support for the group with national youth broadcaster, Triple J, providing their singles, "First Time" and "LMA" with substantial airplay. Tharunkas reviewer, opined that "LMA" is "One of the weaker songs on an album that's as heavy and intense as a death in the family. Verging very close to a ballad, 'LMA' displays all the trademark MOC stop/start syncopation at a much reduced tempo, showing that beneath the hard and tough engineering bloke exteriors they have sentimental sides." A national tour followed, after which Hewson left and Campbell Robinson returned.

1996–2007 This Is This
In December 1996 the Mark of Cain released, Rock and Roll, a compilation album of remixes of the group's earlier material. McFarlane described the work as comprising "off-kilter remixes" of "band favourites." The group contributed two songs to the soundtrack of the Australian feature film, Idiot Box (1996): "Hindsight" and a cover version of "Degenerate Boy" (originally by early Australian punk band X). The latter track was issued as a single and listed at No. 78 on the Triple J Hottest 100, 1997.

Robinson was replaced by Stuart Baguley on drums in late 1998. Baguley was replaced in turn by John Stanier (ex-Helmet, also member of Tomahawk and Battles) in early 2000. He provided the drumming on the Mark of Cain's next album, This Is This, which was co-produced by Andy Gill of Gang of Four, one of the Mark of Cain's early influences, and Phil McKellar (Grinspoon, Regurgitator, The Cruel Sea). It was released by BMG in mid-2001 with the announcement that Stanier was the band's permanent drummer.

Australian rock music journalist, Ed Nimmervoll, declared it as his Album of the Week for 30 June 2001, explaining "With each album they reach deeper into that well of human darkness, trying to finish what they started... [this] album finds the Scott brothers linking arms with [Stanier]. It's an album that nails home its message, song after song, line after line. 'I never wanted this'. 'One time was too many'. 'I sleep better when I'm alone'. The thoughts of the outsider, which have fascinated literature forever and are at the core of rock and roll. When we lose that, rock and roll will be just entertainment." Jasper Lee of Oz Music Project opined that "[it] sees a more refined anger that is shown in particular by the drumming prowess of new drummer [Stanier], which adds to the intense vocals of John Scott... the sound on this album is clear and crisp, bringing down the line all the bile and angry bits to be expected of the band with many a reeling, robust audio left hook that blasts the listener through the speakers." This is This peaked at number 26 on the ARIA Charts.

2008–present: Songs of the Third and Fifth
The Mark of Cain, with Stanier aboard, commenced recording a new album, Songs of the Third and Fifth at Broadcast Studios (Adelaide, Australia) in February 2008, with engineer Evan James. Mixing commenced in December 2010 in Melbourne with Forrester Savell. In December 2011 its lead single, "Barkhammer", was issued and played on Triple J. A second single, "Heart of Stone", was released in September 2012 and finally the long-awaited album, Songs of the Third and Fifth, appeared on 2 December of that year, through Fuse/Feel Presents, earning favourable reviews. i-94 Bars the Barman described how "TMOC occupies the space where hardcore, punk and metal collide and makes unique with a lyrical heaviness that makes listening to Black Sabbath a Sunday walk in the park."

In March 2013 the band toured Australia with Eli Green on drums, sitting in for Stanier who was unable to tour due to his commitments with US band, Tomahawk. They completed further tours in 2014 and 2015, with Green on drums. Rod Archer, their original vocalist until 1985, died of cancer on 26 February 2016. In June 2015 the group had performed a benefit concert for Archer who was then undergoing chemotherapy.

In July 2019, the band announced a national tour to play Battlesick in its entirety, for its 30th anniversary. A similar tour for 2020 marking the 25th anniversary of Ill At Ease was postponed. In 2022, The Mark of Cain was admitted into the South Australian Music Hall of Fame.

Timeline

Discography

Studio albums

Live albums

Compilation albums

Extended plays

Singles

Awards and nominations

AIR Awards
The Australian Independent Record Awards (commonly known informally as AIR Awards) is an annual awards night to recognise, promote and celebrate the success of Australia's Independent Music sector.

|-
| AIR Awards of 2013
|Songs of the Third and Fifth 
| Best Independent Hard Rock or Punk Album
| 
|-

ARIA Music Awards
The ARIA Music Awards are a set of annual ceremonies presented by Australian Recording Industry Association (ARIA), which recognise excellence, innovation, and achievement across all genres of the music of Australia. They commenced in 1987.

! 
|-
| 2001 || This is This || Best Rock Album||  || 
|-

Fowler's Live Music Awards
The Fowler's Live Music Awards took place from 2012 to 2014 to "recognise success and achievement over the past 12 months [and] celebrate the great diversity of original live music" in South Australia. Since 2015 they're known as the South Australian Music Awards.

 
|-
| 2013
| The Mark of Cain
| Best Punk Artist 
| 
|-

South Australian Music Hall Of Fame 
The Mark of Cain has been inducted into the SA Music Hall of Fame, joining The Angels, Cold Chisel and Masters Apprentices as legends of the local music scene.
 
|-
| 2022
| The Mark of Cain
| Hall Of Fame Inductee 
| 
|-

References

General
  Note: Archived [on-line] copy has limited functionality.
Specific

External links
 

Australian alternative metal musical groups
Musical groups from Adelaide
Musical groups established in 1984
Australian musical trios